Sounds of the Season may refer to:

 Sounds of the Season: The Lionel Richie Collection (2006)
 Sounds of the Season: The Enya Holiday Collection (2006)
 Sounds of the Season: The KT Tunstall Holiday Collection (2007)
 Sounds of the Season: The Taylor Swift Holiday Collection (2007)
 Sounds of the Season: The Julianne Hough Holiday Collection'' (2008)